Larry Leland Hendershot (1944–2018) was an American football linebacker in the National Football League for the Washington Redskins.  He played college football at Arizona State University and was drafted in the eighth round of the 1967 NFL Draft.

Hendershot was born January 15, 1944, in Indianapolis, Indiana. He grew up in Phoenix, Arizona, and attended Washington High School. Hendershot set the Arizona State High School record in the shot put at 65'6.00".

After one year with the Washington Redskins, Hendershot was drafted into the US Army, where he served as a cook. He later worked in real estate and property management. He died 27 July 2018.

References

Players of American football from Indianapolis
American football linebackers
Arizona State Sun Devils football players
Washington Redskins players
1944 births
Living people